James Blaine "Rifle Jim" Middleton (May 28, 1889 – January 12, 1974) was a professional baseball player.  He was a right-handed pitcher over parts of two seasons (1917, 1921) with the New York Giants and Detroit Tigers.  For his career, he compiled a 7–12 record in 51 appearances, with a 4.51 earned run average and 40 strikeouts.

He was born and later died in Argos, Indiana, at the age of 84.

See also
 List of Major League Baseball annual saves leaders

External links

1889 births
1974 deaths
Major League Baseball pitchers
Baseball players from Indiana
New York Giants (NL) players
Detroit Tigers players
People from Argos, Indiana
Springfield Senators players
Decatur Commodores players
Decatur Nomads players
Springfield Watchmakers players
Davenport Blue Sox players
Louisville Colonels (minor league) players
Toledo Mud Hens players
Portland Beavers players
Fort Worth Panthers players
Minneapolis Millers (baseball) players
Seattle Indians players
Portland Beavers managers